is the debut Japanese studio album by South Korean boy band Enhypen. It was released on October 26, 2022, through Virgin Music. The album consists of nine tracks, including the Japanese versions of "Blessed-Cursed" and "Future Perfect (Pass the Mic)".

Background and release

In August 2022, Belift Lab confirmed that Enhypen would release their first Japanese studio album in October. Titled Sadame, the album was released on October 26, through Universal Music Japan. It contained nine tracks, including the original Japanese songs "Always" and "Forget Me Not" and the Japanese versions of "Blessed-Cursed" and "Future Perfect (Pass the Mic)", as well as "Polaroid Love" as a CD-only bonus track. The album also featured the new Japanese song "Make the Change", the theme for the second season of the Tokai TV and Fuji TV Japanese drama Saikou no Obahan Nakajima Haruko, which began airing on October 8; the song was digitally pre-released on October 12.

Commercial performance
On the first day of its release, Sadame sold 183,373 copies and placed first on Oricon's Daily Album Ranking.

Track listing

Charts

Weekly charts

Monthly charts

Year-end charts

Certifications and sales

Release history

References

2022 albums
Enhypen albums
Hybe Corporation albums
Japanese-language albums
Universal Music Japan albums